Perch Lake may refer to:
Perch Lake, a lake in Blue Earth County, Minnesota
Perch Lake, a lake in Le Sueur County, Minnesota
Perch Lake, a lake in Lincoln County, Minnesota
Perch Lake, a lake in Martin County, Minnesota
Perch Lake (Delaware County, New York), a lake in Delaware County, New York
Perch Lake (New York), a lake in Jefferson County, New York